The Khurda Road–Nayagarh Town Passenger is a Passenger train belonging to East Coast Railway zone that runs between Khurda Road Junction railway station and , in the Eastern Indian state Odisha.

Arrival and departure
 Train no. 58429DN departs from Khurda Road at 19:35 and reaches Nayagarh Town at 21:30
 Train no. 58430UP  departs from Nayagarh Town at 05:00 and reaches Khurda Road at 07:00
 Train no. 58431DN departs from Khurda Road at 07:45 and reaches Nayagarh Town at 09:30
 Train no. 58432UP  departs from Nayagarh Town at 10:00 and reaches Khurda Road at 11:30

Route and halts
The important halts of the train are :

Loco link 
This train was hauled by a Visakhapatnam-based WDM-3A from Khurda Road to Nayagarh.

See also
 Khurda Road–Bolangir line
 Khurda Road Junction railway station
 Nayagarh Town railway station

Notes

References 

Railway services introduced in 2015
Rail transport in Odisha
Slow and fast passenger trains in India